Gabriele Kraushofer (born Gabriele Glaser) is an Austrian sport shooter who won the 2005 IPSC Handgun World Shoot in the Open division Lady category. She has also won the IPSC European Handgun Championship in the Open division Lady category six times (1995, 1998, 2001, 2004, 2007 and 2010). She is also 23 times Austrian handgun champion in the Lady division.

References

External links
Official Home Page

Living people
IPSC shooters
Year of birth missing (living people)